The men's 3000 metres steeplechase competition of the athletics events at the 2019 Pan American Games took place the 10 August at the 2019 Pan American Games Athletics Stadium. The defending Pan American Games champion is Matthew Hughes from Canada.

Summary
Benard Keter took the lead on the first lap.  After the second barrier, Altobeli da Silva moved out from the middle of the pack to take the point.  Ryan Smeeton followed for the next five laps as others fell off the pace.  The crowd was enthusiastic as home town Mario Bazán stayed in the lead group throughout.  On the penultimate lap, Travis Mahoney came forward to take the lead down the backstretch and over the water jump.  da Silva again took the lead, with Keter moving up to mark.  At the bell, the last in the lead group Carlos San Martín began to move forward.  Smeeton fell oner the barrier before the backstretch.  As Sanmartín moved past Bazán on the backstretch, he picked up a trailer.  Both passed Mahoney before the final water jump and were in a race for the bronze medal still 5 meters back of Keter.  Still four meters behind at the final barrier, the two made a shoulder to shoulder sprint, past Keter into the finish with Sanmartín having a slight edge he held to take silver.

Records
Prior to this competition, the existing world and Pan American Games records were as follows:

Schedule

Results
All times shown are in seconds.

Final
The results were as follows

References

Athletics at the 2019 Pan American Games
2015